Macaria alternata, the sharp-angled peacock, is a moth of the family Geometridae. It is found in Europe, Turkey, the Caucasus, Georgia and South Siberia.

Description
The moth closely resembles the peacock moth (Macaria notata) but can usually be recognized by the deeper cut on the forewing edge (hence the name) as well as the distinctly darker grey band through both wings. However, some specimens may require examination of the genitalia for certain identification.

The moth flies from May to June.

The larva feeds on sallow, alder, blackthorn and sea-buckthorn.

Notes
The flight season refers to the British Isles. This may vary in other parts of the range.

References

External links
Sharp-angled peacock on UKmoths
Lepiforum.de
Vlindernet.nl 
Difficult Species Guide

Macariini
Moths described in 1775
Moths of Asia
Moths of Europe
Taxa named by Michael Denis
Taxa named by Ignaz Schiffermüller